The Montalbán Municipality is one of the 14 municipalities (municipios) that makes up the Venezuelan state of Carabobo and, according to the 2011 census by the National Institute of Statistics of Venezuela, the municipality has a population of 24,908.  The town of Montalbán is the shire town of the Montalbán Municipality.

Demographics
The Montalbán Municipality, according to a 2007 population estimate by the National Institute of Statistics of Venezuela, has a population of 23,712 (up from 20,559 in 2000). This amounts to 1.1% of the state's population.

Government
The mayor of the Montalbán Municipality is Luis Sánchez, elected on November 23, 2008, with 44% of the vote.  He replaced Tulio Salvatierra Salazar shortly after the elections. The municipality is divided into one parish (Montalbán).

References

Municipalities of Carabobo